Alex Klein (born 1964, Porto Alegre) is an oboist who began his musical studies in his native Brazil at the age of nine, and made his solo orchestral debut the following year. At the age of eleven he was invited to join the Camerata Antigua, one of Brazil's foremost chamber ensembles. During his teenage years he toured and performed as a soloist, recitalist and as a member of several professional orchestras in Brazil. He then studied at the Oberlin Conservatory of Music with James Caldwell, earning a BM and an artist diploma in music performance.

After a year at Oberlin he won first prize in the first Lucarelli International Competition for Solo Oboe Players held in Carnegie Hall. He has received many awards worldwide including at the 1988 International Competition for Musical Performers Geneva International Music Competition in Geneva, Switzerland. There he was the first oboist to be awarded the  first prize since Heinz Holliger 29 years earlier.  From 1992 to 1994 he was Assistant Professor of Music, with specialty in oboe and chamber music at the University of Washington in Seattle, Washington, where he performed with the Soni Ventorum Wind Quintet.

He joined the Chicago Symphony Orchestra as principal oboe at age 30 in 1995. He has performed as soloist with the Chicago Symphony, Philadelphia Orchestra, the Orchestre de la Suisse Romande and the Chicago Sinfonietta. He has recorded for Teldec, Boston Records, Newport Classic, Musical Heritage Society and Cedille Records.

Klein won the 2002 Grammy Award for Best Instrumental soloist with Orchestra for his recording of Richard Strauss' Oboe Concerto with Daniel Barenboim and the Chicago Symphony.

Klein left the Chicago Symphony in July 2004 due to musician's focal dystonia which had begun within two years of his assuming the first chair; during a tour of the Far East with the orchestra, he found his fingers would no longer allow him to play at his finest level throughout a symphony by Tchaikovsky, and asked to resign. He currently performs as soloist and conductor, often with leading orchestras. He served as a Professor of Oboe at his alma mater, the Oberlin Conservatory. He is also artistic Director of FEMUSC (Santa Catarina Music Festival, Brazil), participant in the Sunflower Music Festival in Topeka, Kansas, USA, and conductor of the Saint Barths Music Festival (in the French Antilles).

In June 2016, he was once again appointed principal oboe of the Chicago Symphony. As of April 2017, Alex Klein was denied tenure in the CSO as a result of not passing the mandatory probation period.

In October 2018, Klein was appointed principal oboe of the Calgary Philharmonic Orchestra.

Klein plays on an F. Lorée Royal oboe made to his specifications by the Maison Lorée in Paris.

Media

References

External links
Alex Klein, bio, discography, reviews on Cedille Records site
Recording of "Sonata for Oboe and Piano" by Eugène Bozza, with Alex Klein, oboe and Lisa Bergman, piano in MP3 format
Interview with Alex Klein, June 11, 2002

Brazilian classical oboists
American classical oboists
Male oboists
Brazilian emigrants to the United States
Grammy Award winners
1964 births
Living people
Brazilian people of German descent
Cedille Records artists